The Ecuador national beach soccer team represents Ecuador in international beach soccer competitions and is controlled by the Ecuadorian Football Federation, the governing body for football in Ecuador.

The team made their debut in international beach soccer at the 2009 World Cup qualifiers. Having reached the semi-finals of the World Cup qualifying championship on three previous occasions without finishing as one of the top three nations who qualify to the World Cup, Ecuador finally secured their first qualification to the FIFA Beach Soccer World Cup in 2017.

Current squad
As of February 2017

 (captain)

Coach: José Palma

Achievements
 CONMEBOL Beach Soccer Championship Best: 3rd place
 2017
 South American Beach Games Best: 3rd place
 2011
 Copa América Best: 9th place
 2016
 Bolivarian Beach Games Best: 3rd place
 2014

Competitive record

FIFA Beach Soccer World Cup

CONMEBOL Beach Soccer Championship

 – Note: 2005 and 2007 were held in a joint championship with CONCACAF

Sources

BSWW Profile
Squad
Results

South American national beach soccer teams
Beach Soccer